Qipengyuania seohaensis is a Gram-negative, non-spore-forming and slightly halophilic bacteria from the genus Qipengyuania which has been isolated from sea water from the Yellow Sea in Korea.

References

Further reading

External links
Type strain of Erythrobacter seohaensis at BacDive -  the Bacterial Diversity Metadatabase

Sphingomonadales
Bacteria described in 2005